A periodontal probe is an instrument in dentistry commonly used in the dental armamentarium.  It is usually long, thin, and blunted at the end.  The primary purpose of a periodontal probe is to measure pocket depths around a tooth in order to establish the state of health of the periodontium.  There are markings inscribed onto the head of the instrument for accuracy and readability.

Use

Proper use of the periodontal probe is necessary to maintain accuracy.  The tip of the instrument is placed with light pressure of 10-20 grams into the gingival sulcus, which is an area of potential space between a tooth and the surrounding tissue.  It is important to keep the periodontal probe parallel to the contours of the root of the tooth and to insert the probe down to the base of the pocket.  This results in obscuring a section of the periodontal probe's tip.  The first marking visible above the pocket indicates the measurement of the pocket depth.  It has been found that the average, healthy pocket depth is around 3 mm with no bleeding upon probing.  Depths greater than 3 mm can be associated with "attachment loss" of the tooth to the surrounding alveolar bone, which is a characteristic found in periodontitis.  Pocket depths greater than 3 mm can also be a sign of gingival hyperplasia.

The periodontal probe can also be used to measure other dental instruments, tooth preparations during restorative procedures, gingival recession, attached gingiva, and oral lesions or pathologies. Bleeding on probing (BoP), even with a gentle touch, can also occur in this situation. It is due to the periodontal probe damaging the increased blood vessels in the capillary plexus of the lamina propria, which are close to the surface because of the ulceration of the junctional epithelium (JE). The presence of bleeding is one of the first clinical signs of active periodontal disease in uncomplicated cases and should be recorded per individual tooth and tooth surface in the patient record. However, in patients who smoke, the gingival tissue rarely bleeds because of unknown factors that do not seem related to dental biofilm and calculus formation.

There are many different types of periodontal probes, and each has its own manner of indicating measurements on the tip of the instrument.  For example, the Michigan O probe has markings at 3 mm, 6 mm and 8 mm  and the Williams probe has circumferential lines at 1 mm, 2 mm, 3 mm, 5 mm, 7 mm, 8 mm, 9 mm, and 10 mm.  The PCP12 probe with Marquis markings has alternating shades every 3 mm.  Unlike the previous two mentioned, the Naber's probe is curved and is used for measuring into the furcation area between the roots of a tooth.

References

Additional references
 Summit, James B., J. William Robbins, and Richard S. Schwartz.  "Fundamentals of Operative Dentistry: A Contemporary Approach."  2nd edition.  Carol Stream, Illinois, Quintessence Publishing Co, Inc, 2001.  .
 Wilkins, Esther M.  "Clinical Practice of the Dental Hygienist." 8th edition.  Lippincott Williams & Wilkins, 1999.  .
 Hefti AF. Periodontal probing. Crit Rev Oral Biol Med. 1997;8(3):336-56. doi: 10.1177/10454411970080030601. PMID 9260047.
 Ramachandra SS, Mehta DS, Sandesh N, Baliga V, Amarnath J. Periodontal probing systems: a review of available equipment. Compend Contin Educ Dent. 2011 Mar;32(2):71-7. PMID 21473303.

External links

Dental equipment